Epidendrum nutans, the nodding epidendrum, is a species of orchid in the genus Epidendrum.

References

nutans